This is a list of preachers who reached their parishioners through the medium of radio.

 Herbert W. Armstrong (1892–1986), Worldwide Church of God
 C. W. Burpo (1904–1982), fundamentalist
 E. Howard Cadle (1884–1942)
 S. Parkes Cadman (1864–1936), liberal Protestant
 Charles Coughlin (1891–1979), Roman Catholic
 Theodore Epp (1907–1985), Mennonite
 Paul Edwin Finkenbinder (1921–2012), known as Hermano Pablo, Pentecostal?
 Charles E. Fuller (1887–1968), Baptist
 Oliver B. Greene (1915–1976), fundamental Independent Baptist
 Mordecai Ham (1877–1961), Independent Baptist
 Sergei Kourdakov (1951–1973), Evangelical
 John W. Murray (1913–1996), Evangelical?
 Walter A. Maier (1893–1950), Lutheran
 Aimee Semple McPherson (1890–1944), Pentecostal
 Lester Roloff (1914–1982), fundamental Independent Baptist
 Robert P. Shuler (1880–1965), Methodist
 Omega Townsend (1927–1992), known as Prophet Omega
 Jack Wyrtzen (1913–1996)

See also
 List of television evangelists

 
Radio evangelists